An agrochemical or agrichemical is a generic term for the various chemical products used in agriculture.

Agrochemical may also refer to:

 Agrochemical F.C., a Kenyan football club in FKF Division One